Enchev, Entchev is a Bulgarian surname, its female form is Encheva or Entcheva.

Emilia Entcheva
Ivan Enchev-Vidyu
Miroslav Enchev
Velizar Enchev

See also
Zvezdelina Entcheva Stankova

Bulgarian-language surnames